Hollywood Premiere Theatre was the original title of an American television program that was broadcast more often as Hollywood Theatre Time on the ABC Television Network from September 20, 1950 to October 5, 1951.
 
Content varied from week to week, including situation comedies, dramatic presentations, and scenes from well-known plays. Some early episodes were a variety program, The Gil Lamb Show.

The series was one of the first anthology shows aired from the West Coast, with viewers in the East seeing kinescopes of episodes. It featured  the TV debut of singer Gale Storm. Two writers who worked on I Love Lucy, Bob Carroll, Jr. and Madelyn Davis, worked as writers on this series. George M. Cahan and Thomas W. Sarnoff were the producers.

The program's competition included The Victor Borge Show on NBC and The Sam Levinson Show on CBS.

Storm co-starred with Don DeFore in "Mr. and Mrs. Detective" (alternately titled "Mystery and Mrs." on the show's September 27, 1950, episode. It was a pilot for a prospective series, but the series was not developed.

Broadcast history
September 20, 1950 - November 29, 1950 (Wednesdays 7:00-7:30pm ET) as Hollywood Premiere Theatre
December 6, 1950 - June 6, 1951 (Wednesdays 7:00-7:30pm ET) as Hollywood Theatre Time
June 15, 1951 - October 5, 1951  (Fridays 10:00-10:30pm ET) as Hollywood Theatre Time

See also
1950-51 United States network television schedule
1951-52 United States network television schedule

References

External links
Hollywood Premiere Theatre at IMDB
Hollywood Premiere Theatre at CTVA with list of episodes

American Broadcasting Company original programming
Black-and-white American television shows
English-language television shows
1950s American anthology television series
1950 American television series debuts
1951 American television series endings